This is a list of monuments that are classified by the Moroccan ministry of culture around Tetouan.

Monuments and sites in Tetouan 

|}

References 

Tetouan
Tétouan